Christopher Akerlind (born May 1, 1962, in Hartford, Connecticut)
is an American lighting designer for theatre, opera, and dance. He won the Tony Award for Best Lighting Design for Indecent. He also won the Tony Award for Best Lighting Design and the Drama Desk Award for Outstanding Lighting Design for Light in the Piazza and an Obie Award for sustained excellence for his work Off-Broadway.
 
He attended Boston University College of Fine Arts (1985) and the Yale School of Drama, training with Jennifer Tipton.

He was Head of Lighting Design and Director of the Design & Production Programs at the CalArts School of Theater.

He has designed many Broadway and Off-Broadway productions, working on both musicals and straight plays. He is noted for his work for director Lloyd Richards on the first productions of the plays of August Wilson, including The Piano Lesson (1990) and Seven Guitars (1996).

He was the Resident Lighting Designer for twelve years at the Opera Theatre of Saint Louis.

Akerlind was a Visiting Associate Professor and Director of Production at the University of Southern California School of the Theatre (now the School of Dramatic Arts) from 2007 to 2008, has guest taught at New York University, the University of Connecticut, Yale, and for the Broadway Lighting Master Classes.

Work (selected)
The Piano Lesson (1990)
Mad Forest (1992) - Drama Desk Award nominee, Outstanding Lighting Design
Shining Brow (1993)
The Lights (1994) - Drama Desk Award nominee, Outstanding Lighting Design
Seven Guitars (1996) - Tony Award nominee, Best Lighting Design
The Tale of the Allergist's Wife (2000)
Well (2004) - Lucille Lortel Award nomination
The Light in the Piazza (2005)
Belle Epoque (2005) - Drama Desk Award nominee, Outstanding Lighting Design; Lucille Lortel Award nomination
Awake and Sing (2006) - Tony Award and Drama Desk Award nominee, Best Lighting Design of a Play
110 In The Shade (2007) -  Tony Award nominee, Best Lighting Design of a Musical
Top Girls (2008)
Garden of Earthly Delights (2008) - Lucille Lortel Award win
Chéri (2013)
Rocky (2014) 
The Last Ship (2014)
Waitress (2016)

References

External links
 
Akerlind listing, Internet Off-Broadway database
Credits at filmreference.com

Yale School of Drama alumni
1962 births
Living people
American lighting designers
Tony Award winners
Boston University College of Fine Arts alumni